The southern red-sided opossum (Monodelphis sorex) is an opossum species from South America. It is found in Argentina, Brazil and Paraguay.

This opossum has small rounded ears, a long pointed nose and a tail which is half as long as its body. The head, neck and foreparts are grey, the back is dark brown and the rump is reddish. It has short fur and the males are larger than the females. It is terrestrial and mainly feeds on insects, although it will also eat small vertebrates and fruit. Unlike most marsupials, the female has no pouch for the developing young. They cling to the mother's nipples and when they are older, ride on her back and flanks.

It is also called the shrewish short-tailed opossum, or dwarf short-tailed opossum.

References

Opossums
Marsupials of South America
Mammals of Brazil
Fauna of the Atlantic Forest
Mammals described in 1872
Taxobox binomials not recognized by IUCN